Liolaemus victormoralesii is a species of lizard in the family Iguanidae or the family Liolaemidae. The species is endemic to Peru.

References

victormoralesii
Lizards of South America
Reptiles of Peru
Endemic fauna of Peru
Reptiles described in 2019
Taxa named by Jack W. Sites Jr.